The Karl G. Jansky Very Large Array (VLA) is a centimeter-wavelength radio astronomy observatory in the southwestern United States. It lies in central New Mexico on the Plains of San Agustin, between the towns of Magdalena and Datil, ~ west of Socorro. The VLA comprises twenty-eight 25-meter radio telescopes (twenty-seven of which are operational while one is always rotating through maintenance) deployed in a Y-shaped array and all the equipment, instrumentation, and computing power to function as an interferometer. Each of the massive telescopes is mounted on double parallel railroad tracks, so the radius and density of the array can be transformed to adjust the balance between its angular resolution and its surface brightness sensitivity. Astronomers using the VLA have made key observations of black holes and protoplanetary disks around young stars, discovered magnetic filaments and traced complex gas motions at the Milky Way's center, probed the Universe's cosmological parameters, and provided new knowledge about the physical mechanisms that produce radio emission.

It is a component of the National Radio Astronomy Observatory (NRAO). The NRAO is a facility of the National Science Foundation  operated under cooperative agreement by Associated Universities, Inc.

Characteristics 
The radio telescope comprises 27 independent antennas in use at a given time plus one spare, each of which has a dish diameter of 25 meters (82 feet) and weighs . Using the rail tracks that follow each of these arms—and that, at one point, intersect with U.S. Route 60 at a level crossing—and a specially designed lifting locomotive ("Hein's Trein"), the antennas can be physically relocated to a number of prepared positions, allowing aperture synthesis interferometry with up to 351 independent baselines: in essence, the array acts as a single antenna with a variable diameter. The angular resolution that can be reached is between 0.2 and 0.04 arcseconds.

There are four commonly used configurations, designated A (the largest) through D (the tightest, when all the dishes are within  of the center point). The observatory normally cycles through all the various possible configurations (including several hybrids) every 16 months; the antennas are moved every three to four months.  Moves to smaller configurations are done in two stages, first shortening the east and west arms and later shortening the north arm.  This allows for a short period of improved imaging of extremely northerly or southerly sources.

The Pete V. Domenici Science Operations Center (DSOC) for the VLA is located on the campus of the New Mexico Institute of Mining and Technology in Socorro, New Mexico. The DSOC also serves as the control center for the Very Long Baseline Array (VLBA), a VLBI array of ten 25-meter dishes located from Hawaii in the west to the U.S. Virgin Islands in the east that constitutes the world's largest dedicated, full-time astronomical instrument.

Upgrade and renaming
In 2011, a decade-long upgrade project resulted in the VLA expanding its technical capacities by factors of up to 8,000. The 1970s-era electronics were replaced with state-of-the-art equipment. To reflect this increased capacity, VLA officials asked for input from both the scientific community and the public in coming up with a new name for the array, and in January 2012 it was announced that the array would be renamed the "Karl G. Jansky Very Large Array". On March 31, 2012, the VLA was officially renamed in a ceremony inside the Antenna Assembly Building.

Key science
The VLA is a multi-purpose instrument designed to allow investigations of many astronomical objects, including radio galaxies, quasars, pulsars, supernova remnants, gamma-ray bursts, radio-emitting stars, the sun and planets, astrophysical masers, black holes, and the hydrogen gas that constitutes a large portion of the Milky Way galaxy as well as external galaxies.  In 1989 the VLA was used to receive radio communications from the Voyager 2 spacecraft as it flew by Neptune. A search of the galaxies M31 and M32 was conducted in December 2014 through January 2015 with the intent of quickly searching trillions of systems for extremely powerful signals from advanced civilizations.

It has been used to carry out several large surveys of radio sources, including the NRAO VLA Sky Survey and Faint Images of the Radio Sky at Twenty-Centimeters.

In September 2017 the VLA Sky Survey (VLASS) began. This survey will cover the entire sky visible to the VLA (80% of the Earth's sky) in three full scans. Astronomers expect to find about 10 million new objects with the survey — four times more than what is presently known.

History
The driving force for the development of the VLA was David S. Heeschen. He is noted as having "sustained and guided the development of the best radio astronomy observatory in the world for sixteen years." Congressional approval for the VLA project was given in August 1972, and construction began some six months later. It was the largest configuration of radio telescopes in the world.

During construction in 1975, workers laying the tracks for the northern arm of the array discovered a human skeleton north of US-60. A year later, the remains were identified as belonging to a male airline passenger who was ejected from National Airlines Flight 27 at  two years earlier, after the DC-10-10 servicing the flight (N60NA) experienced an uncontained engine failure, causing cabin decompression.

With a view to upgrading the venerable 1970s technology with which the VLA was built, the VLA has evolved into the Expanded Very Large Array (EVLA). The upgrade has enhanced the instrument's sensitivity, frequency range, and resolution with the installation of new hardware at the San Agustin site.

Magdalena Ridge Observatory is a new observatory a few miles south of the VLA,and is run by VLA collaborator New Mexico Tech. Under construction at this site is a ten-element optical interferometer.

Tourism 

U.S. Route 60 passes east–west through the complex.

The VLA site is open to visitors with paid admission. A visitor center houses a small museum, theater, and a gift shop.  A self-guided walking tour is available, as the visitor center is not staffed continuously.  Visitors unfamiliar with the area are warned that there is little food on site, or in the sparsely populated surroundings; those unfamiliar with the high desert are warned that the weather is quite variable, and can remain cold into April. For those who cannot travel to the site, the NRAO created a virtual tour of the VLA called the VLA Explorer.

The VLA site was previously closed to visitors from March 2020 through October 2022.

In popular culture
The VLA has appeared repeatedly in popular culture since its construction.

 The VLA is present in the 1984 movie 2010: The Year We Make Contact, as the location where Dr. Floyd and Dimitri Moiseyevich discuss the upcoming missions to Jupiter.
 The VLA is present in the 1997 movie Contact, as the location where the alien signal is first detected.
 British artist Keith Tyson created a 300 piece sculpture called Large Field Array (2006–2007) named after the VLA.
 In the 2009 science-fiction film Terminator Salvation, the VLA is the location of a Skynet facility. At the beginning of the film the site is attacked by Resistance forces.
A parody of the VLA, known as The Big Ear, appears in the 2004 action-adventure video game Grand Theft Auto: San Andreas, sharing its name with a SETI project from Ohio State University. A single huge dish forms The Big Ear in-game.
 In Season 2, Episode 1 of the BBC series "Luther", which first aired 29 sep 2011, the character Alice Morgan (played by Ruth Wilson) tells Luther that "I've always wanted to go and see the Very Large Array in New Mexico. It's not the biggest in the world, of course, or the most iconic, but I grew up wanting to see it. It's quite spectacular, out there in the desert."
 In the video game Horizon Forbidden West, the Utaru tribe's capital of Plainsong is built amongst the ruins of a centralized cluster of dishes in the Array, and the surrounding fields have been terraformed into farmland.

Trivia 
 An image of the Very Large Array appeared on the cover of Bon Jovi's 2002 studio album, Bounce.

See also 
 Allen Telescope Array (ATA)
 Atacama Large Millimeter Array (ALMA)
 Green Bank Telescope (GBT)
 Lake San Agustín, which once stood where the VLA is now
 List of radio telescopes
 Square Kilometre Array (SKA)
 Very-long-baseline interferometry (VLBI)
 Very Small Array (VSA)

References

External links 

 
 VLA Explorer
 The Karl G. Jansky Very Large Array page at NRAO
 
 The Next Generation Very Large Array (ngVLA)

Astronomical observatories in New Mexico
Buildings and structures in Socorro County, New Mexico
Interferometric telescopes
Museums in Socorro County, New Mexico
Radio telescopes
Science museums in New Mexico
1980 establishments in New Mexico